Bommeria is a genus of small pteridaceous rock ferns, native to the New World. Genetic analysis has shown it to be a stem offshoot clade of all the cheilanthoid ferns (in family Pteridaceae), except for Doryopteris, which is an even more basal ("primitive") stem offshoot.  for years, it was assumed that this genus was closely allied with Hemionitis, but genetic analysis has shown that genus to be a more advanced genus evolutionarily.  The same set of analysis has shown many presumed genera within this family to be paraphyletic, but the small genus Bommeria appears to be monophyletic, or a natural genus.

Bommeria is a "gymnogrammoid" fern, exhibiting unprotected sori aligned along veins on the undersides of the fronds.  This is why it was assumed to be closely allied to Hemionitis.  Such a feature is strongly at odds with most pteridoid ferns (Pteridaceae), which typically have linear marginal sori with an indusium, and sometimes protected with a reflexed leaf tissue margin.  Apparently, this is a trait that can arise independently, and may be an atavistic trait.

The stipes (leaf stems) of Bommeria are hairy, with some scales, and the fronds are hairy, both above and below.  The hairs above and short and sharp, while the hairs below may be straight or curled.  Scales are also present on the bottoms of the fronds.

The genus name honors Belgian botanist Jean-Édouard Bommer. The basal chromosome number for this genus is 2n=60 (n=30).

Species
, the Checklist of Ferns and Lycophytes of the World recognized the following species:
Bommeria ehrenbergiana (Klotzsch) Underw. – Mexico
Bommeria elegans (Davenp.) Ranker & Haufler – Mexico
Bommeria hispida (Kuhn) Underw. – copper fern; Mexico, Arizona, New Mexico, Texas
Bommeria pedata (Sw.) E.Fourn. — western Mexico and Central America
Bommeria subpaleacea Maxon

References

Further reading
Haufler, Christopher H. "A biosystematic revision of Bommeria." Journal of the Arnold Arboretum 60:445-476. 1979.
Maxon, William. "Studies of Tropical American Ferns." Contributions from the United States National Herbarium, Volume 17, United States National Herbarium, United States. Division of Botany, United States National Museum.  1916.
Windham, M.D., L. Huiet, E. Schuettpelz, A.L. Grusz, C. Rothfels, J. Beck, G. Yatskievych, and K.M. Pryer. "Using plastid and nuclear DNA sequences to redraw generic boundaries and demystify species complexes in cheilanthoid ferns." American Fern Journal 99: 128–132. 2009.
Yarborough, Sharon C. and A. Michael Powell. Ferns and Fern Allies of the Trans-Pecos and Adjacent Areas. Texas Tech University Press, Texas. 2002. 116pp, b/w ill, maps, PB. . (for Bommeria hispida and genus description)

Pteridaceae
Ferns of the United States
Flora of the Southwestern United States
Flora of Northwestern Mexico
Flora of Northeastern Mexico
Flora of Central America
Flora of New Mexico
Fern genera